Gheorgheni is a district located in the east of Cluj-Napoca in Romania. It was built in the 1960s during the Communist era with many green areas.

Districts of Cluj-Napoca